Greater Poland or Great Poland (Polish: Wielkopolska) is a historic region of west-central Poland.

Greater Poland may also refer to:
the Duchy of Greater Poland (1138–1320)
 Greater Poland Voivodeship or Wielkopolska Province, reformed in 1999
 Greater Poland Regional Assembly
 Greater Poland (European Parliament constituency), formed after the 2004 enlargement of the European Union

See also
 Greater Poland Uprising (disambiguation)